Jhoanner Stalin Chávez Quintero (born 25 April 2002) is an Ecuadorian footballer who plays as left back for Brazilian club Bahia and the Ecuador national team.

Club career

Independiente del Valle
Born in Puerto Francisco de Orellana, Chávez joined Independiente del Valle's youth setup in 2014, aged 12. After making his senior debut with the reserve team Independiente Juniors, he made his first team debut on 30 September 2020, coming on as a late substitute for Fernando Guerrero in a 4–0 away loss against Flamengo, for the year's Copa Libertadores.

Chávez made his Ecuadorian Serie A debut on 6 December 2020, replacing Luis Segovia in a 2–0 home win over El Nacional. He scored his first professional goal on 2 April 2022, netting his team's second in a 3–1 away success over Gualaceo.

Bahia
On 7 January 2023, Chávez was announced at Campeonato Brasileiro Série A side Bahia on a five-year contract.

International career
After representing Ecuador at under-17 level, Chávez received his first call-up for the full side on 9 November 2022, for a friendly against Iraq. He made his full international debut three days later, coming on as a half-time substitute Félix Torres in the 0–0 draw at the Metropolitano Stadium in Madrid.

Career statistics

Club

International

Honours
Independiente del Valle
Ecuadorian Serie A: 2021
Copa Sudamericana: 2022
Copa Ecuador: 2022

References

2002 births
Living people
People from Orellana Province
Ecuadorian footballers
Association football defenders
Ecuadorian Serie A players
C.S.D. Independiente del Valle footballers
Esporte Clube Bahia players
Ecuadorian expatriate footballers
Ecuadorian expatriate sportspeople in Brazil
Expatriate footballers in Brazil